Adaro may refer to:

 Adaro (mythology), a race of sea spirits from the mythology of the Solomon Islands
 Adaro (company), Spanish aircraft manufacturer
 Adaro (DJ), Dutch hardstyle DJ and producer
 Adaro (band), German medieval folk rock band
 Adaro Energy, Indonesian coal mining company